RR (stylized as RЯ or R∞Я) is the upcoming collaborative extended play (EP) by Spanish singer Rosalía and Puerto Rican singer Rauw Alejandro. It will be released on March 24, 2023.

Background 
Rosalía and Alejandro were first rumored to be dating in August 2021 after being seen in public together by paparazzi. They confirmed their relationship the next month with photos of the two celebrating Rosalía's 29th birthday together. In May 2022, Alejandro told Billboard that they'd been working together in the studio and had material with plans to release it. Rosalía confirmed this in her own Billboard interview in November. The project was announced on March 13, 2023, with the cover art, track list, and release date posted to social media.

Track listing

References 

2023 EPs
Rauw Alejandro EPs
Rosalía EPs
Spanish-language EPs